Destino is a Mexican telenovela produced by Televisa for Telesistema Mexicano in 1963.

Cast 
Carmen Montejo
Rafael Banquells
Luis Lara
Virginia Gutiérrez
Pilar Sen
Lucha Altamirano
Alma Rodriguez
Maria Wagner

References

External links 

Mexican telenovelas
1963 telenovelas
Televisa telenovelas
1963 Mexican television series debuts
1963 Mexican television series endings
Spanish-language telenovelas